The 2012 National Football Challenge Cup was the 22nd edition of National Football Challenge Cup, the domestic cup competition in Pakistani football. The edition was sponsored by Karachi Port Trust, therefore, it was also known as the 2012 KPT Challenge Cup.

The tournament was held in Karachi, with KPT Stadium and People's Football Stadium having two matches played simultaneously.

Khan Research Laboratories were the defending champions, having won their third title the previous year after defeating National Bank 1–0 in the finals.

Khan Research Laboratories won the title after defeating Karachi Electric Supply Corporation 3–1 on penalties the after game ended 0–0 after extra-time.

Teams
A total of 16 teams participated in the tournament:

 Khan Research LaboratoriesTH, PPL
 WAPDA
 Karachi Port Trust (H)
 Pakistan Army
 Pakistan Airforce
 Pakistan Railways
 Pakistan Navy
 Karachi Electric Supply Corporation
 Pakistan Steel 
 National Bank
 National Youth B
 National Youth A
 Gwadar Port Authority
 Pakistan Police
 Ashraf Sugar Mills
 Pakistan Public Work Department

Notes TH = Challenge Cup title holders; PPL = Pakistan Premier League winners; H = Host

Group stages

Group A

Group B

Group C

The match was abandoned, when Pakistan Police players slapped the referee for awarding penalty to Khan Research Laboratories on 16th minute. Pakistan Football Federation awarded forfeit to Khan Research Laboratories and suspended and fined 6 Pakistan Police players with Rs. 20,000 each.

Group D

Knockout round

Quarter-finals

Semi-finals

Third place match

Finals

Statistics
 Fastest goal: 1 minute — Tariq Badal for Gwadar Port Authority against Karachi Electric Supply Corporation (13 March 2012).
 Most hat-tricks: 3 — Muhammad Rasool
 First player Pakistani player to score hat-trick in three consecutive match since Ali Nawaz, who scored 9 goals against East End Club playing for Dhaka Mohammaden in Dhaka League.

Top scorer

References

Football competitions in Pakistan
Pakistan National Football Challenge Cup
Pakistan
2012 in Pakistani sport
2012 in Pakistan
2010s in Pakistani sport
2010s in Pakistan
Sport in Karachi
2010s in Karachi